The 1980 Labatt Brier, the Canadian men's curling championship was held from March 2 to 9, 1980 at the Stampede Corral in Calgary, Alberta. For the third consecutive year, the Brier set a then-record as the total attendance for the week was 93,185.

With a new sponsor came several changes to the Brier to make it more fan friendly such as a ban on smoking, a baseball-type scoreboard replacing the curling club-style scoreboard, and official umpires. The two biggest changes however were a three-team playoff after round robin play would determine the Brier champion with the top team in round robin play receiving a direct bye into the final and a new, shiny Labatt Tankard trophy replaced the old Macdonald Tankard trophy.

Team Saskatchewan, who was skipped by Rick Folk captured the Brier tankard after they defeated Northern Ontario in the final 10–6. Northern Ontario advanced to the final after they defeated Alberta in the semifinal 6–5.

The Folk rink would go onto represent Canada in the 1980 Air Canada Silver Broom, the men's world curling championship on home soil in Moncton, New Brunswick where they won Canada's first world championship since 1972.

Teams
The teams were listed as follows:

Round robin standings
Final Round Robin standings

Round robin results
All draw times are listed in Mountain Standard Time (UTC-07:00).

Draw 1
Sunday, March 2, 2:00 pm

Draw 2
Sunday, March 2, 7:30 pm

Draw 3
Monday, March 3, 9:00 am

Draw 4
Monday, March 3, 1:30 pm

Draw 5
Monday, March 3, 7:30 pm

Draw 6
Tuesday, March 4, 9:00 am

Draw 7
Tuesday, March 4, 1:30 pm

Draw 8
Tuesday, March 4, 7:30 pm

Draw 9
Wednesday, March 5, 9:00 am

Draw 10
Wednesday, March 5, 1:30 pm

Draw 11
Wednesday, March 5, 7:30 pm

Draw 12
Thursday, March 6, 1:30 pm

Draw 13
Thursday, March 6, 7:30 pm

Draw 14
Friday, March 7, 9:00 am

Draw 15
Friday, March 7, 1:30 pm

Playoffs
Source:

Semifinal
Saturday, March 8, 12:30 pm

Final
Sunday, March 9, 12:00 pm

Statistics

Top 5 player percentages
Final Round Robin Percentages

Awards

All-Star Team 
The media selected the following curlers as All-Stars.

Ross G.L. Harstone Award
The Ross Harstone Award was presented to the player chosen by their fellow peers as the curler who best represented Harstone's high ideals of good sportsmanship, observance of the rules, exemplary conduct and curling ability.

References

External links
Semi-final on YouTube

Labatt Brier
1980
Curling competitions in Calgary
Labatt Brier
Labatt Brier